Rosehill Elmwood Cemetery is located at 1300 Old Hartford Road Owensboro Daviess County Kentucky. There are about 55,000 interments. It is officially recognized as a historical landmark by the state of Kentucky. Notable people buried in the cemetery include a number of US Congressman,  as well as Rainey Bethea, the last person to be publicly executed in America.

Notable people
 Rainey Bethea
 William Thomas Ellis
 Wendell Hampton Ford
 Christine Johnson
 James Leeper Johnson
 Thomas Clay McCreery
 John Hardin McHenry, Sr
 Johnny Morrison
 William Northcut Sweeney
 Philip Thompson
 Charles Stewart Todd
 George Washington Triplett
 Philip Triplett

References

External links
 
 
 
 

Cemeteries in Kentucky
Daviess County, Kentucky